Keşkül is an almond-based milk pudding from Turkish cuisine. Usually served in a bowl and eaten with a spoon, it is often garnished with coconut shaving or pistachio nuts and is off-white in colour.

Etymology 
The dish's name is derived from the Ottoman Turkish idiomatic expression "keşkül-i fukara" meaning "beggar's bowl". The word keşkül and it's respective idiom is ultimately traced back to Persian kaşkūl (كشكول), meaning "beggar" or "beggar's bowl". The oldest written usage of the word in a Turkic language is traced backed to Franciscus a Mesgnien Meninski's Thesaurus. According to Meninski the word originally meant  or scyphus. The usage of the word to indicate the dessert is first attested in Şemseddin Sami's 1900 work .

See also 
Muhallebi

References

Turkish puddings
Turkish words and phrases
Almond desserts